Montaldo di Mondovì is a comune (municipality) in the Province of Cuneo in the Italian region Piedmont, located about  south of Turin and about  southeast of Cuneo.

Montaldo di Mondovì borders the following municipalities: Frabosa Soprana, Monastero di Vasco, Roburent, Torre Mondovì, and Vicoforte.

References

Cities and towns in Piedmont